The following is a compilation of notable Canadian Premier League records and statistics for teams and players. The Canadian Premier League includes statistics from the CPL Finals in their season totals.

Champions

Canadian Premier League Finals

Award winners

Golden Boot

Golden Glove

Coach of the Year

Player of the Year

Best Under 21 Canadian Player of the Year

Career player records 
Statistics below are for all-time leaders and include regular season and playoffs. Bold indicates active players. Team is the current team or for inactive players the last CPL team they played for. Current to the end of the 2022 regular season and playoffs.

Goals

Assists

Clean sheets

Appearances

Hat-tricks

Club statistics

All-time regular season table
The all-time regular season table is a cumulative record of all match results, points and goals of every team that has played in the Canadian Premier League since its inception in 2019, excluding playoffs.
As of 2022 season

All-time regular season finishing positions

Best regular season records

CPL results in the Canadian Championship

Highest scoring games and largest victories

Largest victories

Highest scoring games

Transfer records

Highest transfer fees received

Attendance records
Highest Attendance; 17,611, Forge FC vs York9, April 27, 2019
Lowest Attendance; 0, 2020 Island Games

Seasonal average attendances

Notes

References

Canadian Premier League records and statistics
All-time football league tables